The Rush Fire was the largest wildfire of the 2012 California wildfire season. The fire, which started in Lassen County, California, eventually spread into Washoe County, Nevada. At the time, the burn area in California made the Rush Fire the second-largest wildfire in California since 1932 (when accurate area estimates became available). In December 2017, the Thomas Fire surpassed the Rush Fire to become the second-largest wildfire in modern California history, in terms of the area burned in California. In mid-August 2018, the Ranch Fire in the Mendocino Complex Fire surpassed the total acreage of the Rush Fire in both California and Nevada.

The fire destroyed important habitat for the greater sage-grouse, as well as a single barn. On August 30, 2012, the Rush Fire was 100% contained.

See also

List of California wildfires

References

2012 California wildfires
Wildfires in Lassen County, California
August 2012 events in the United States